The India men's national softball team is the national softball team of India in international-level softball competitions.

Tournament history

Men's Softball World Championship
 2017 Men's Softball World Championship - 15th

Asian Men's Softball Championship
 1985 Asian Men's Softball Championship - participated
 1998 Asian Men's Softball Championship - participated
 2003 Asian Men's Softball Championship - participated
 2012 Asian Men's Softball Championship - participated
 2018 Asian Men's Softball Championship - participated

References

National team
Men's national softball teams
Softball